The Women in Black is a 1993 novel by Australian author Madeleine St John. It is her first novel, and is the only one she set in Australia.

Plot summary 
The novel tells the story of a group of department store employees in 1959 Sydney. It is set primarily during the Christmas rush period when young school leaver, Lisa, joins the women.

Adaptations 
In 2015, the novel was adapted to a stage musical, re-titled Ladies in Black, by Carolyn Burns with music and lyrics by Tim Finn.

The novel was also adapted into a movie in 2018, titled Ladies in Black, and directed by Australian film director Bruce Beresford. Beresford spent some 25 years trying to raise the money to make this film after securing the rights from St John, whom he'd known at Sydney University in the 1960s. He reconnected with her after their mutual friend Clive James recommended the book to him.

References 

Australian novels
Australian novels adapted into films
1993 Australian novels
Novels set in Sydney